Sutton is a census-designated place in western Griggs County, North Dakota, United States. An unincorporated community, it was designated as part of the U.S. Census Bureau's Participant Statistical Areas Program on March 31, 2010. It was not counted separately during the 2000 Census, but was included in the 2010 Census, where a population of 17 was reported.

It lies west of the city of Cooperstown, the county seat of Griggs County. It had a post office with the ZIP code 58484.

Demographics

References

Census-designated places in Griggs County, North Dakota
Census-designated places in North Dakota
Unincorporated communities in North Dakota
Unincorporated communities in Griggs County, North Dakota